The 1960 FIVB Women's World Championship was the third edition of the tournament, organised by the world's governing body, the FIVB. It was held from 29 October to 13 November 1960 in Brazil.

Teams

Squads

Venues

Source:

Format
The tournament was played in two different stages (first and final rounds). A single round-robin format was played within each group to determine the teams group position, all teams progressed to the next round.

A single round-robin format was played within each group with matches already played between teams in the  also counted in this round.

Pools composition

Results

First round

Pool A

|}

Location: Santos

|}

Location: Santo André

|}

Location: São Paulo

|}

Location: Santos

|}

Location: Santo André

|}

Pool B
Location: Belo Horizonte

|}

|}

Pool C
Location: Belo Horizonte

|}

|}

Final round
The results and the points of the matches between the same teams that were already played during the first round are taken into account for the final round.

7th–10th places
Location: Volta Redonda

|}

|}

Final places
Location: Rio de Janeiro and Niterói

|}

|}

Final standing

References

External links
 FIVB Results
 Results - todor66
 Results
 Federation Internationale de Volleyball

FIVB Women's World Championship
International sports competitions in Rio de Janeiro (city)
1960
1960 in Brazilian women's sport
International volleyball competitions hosted by Brazil
October 1960 sports events in South America
November 1960 sports events in South America
Women's volleyball in Brazil
20th century in Rio de Janeiro